Yevgeni Smirnov may refer to:
 Yevgeni Aleksandrovich Smirnov (born 1986), Russian footballer with FC Tekstilshchik Ivanovo
 Yevgeni Smirnov (basketball), basketball player
 Yevgeni Smirnov (cinematographer), Russian cinematographer
 Yevgeni Smirnov (footballer, born 1994), Russian footballer